Harvest Christian College is an interdenominational Christian school located in Kadina, South Australia. Originally called Harvest Christian School, the name was changed in 2016. It serves over 300 students from Reception to year 12. The school is affiliated with Christian Schools Australia (CSA) Ltd and the Association of Independent Schools of South Australia and is registered by the Non-Government Schools Registration Board.

The Copper Triangle Christian School Association was officially formed on 3 February 1997. Almost three years to that day on 31 January 2000 Harvest Christian School opened its doors to students for the first time.

References

External links
Harvest Christian College

High schools in South Australia
Primary schools in South Australia
Private schools in South Australia